Canaveris is the surname of the following people
Ángel Canaveris (1847–1897), Argentine psychiatrist, son of Juan Manuel 
Isabelino Canaveris (1852-1900s), Uruguayan patriot, military, revolutionary and politician
Juan de Canaveris (1748–1822), Italian lawyer
Juan Manuel Canaveris (1804–1868), Argentine attorney, merchant, teacher and military officer, son of José and brother of Feliciano
Joaquín Canaveris (1789–1840s), Argentine merchant and city official, son of Juan
José Canaveris (1780–1837), Argentine politician, notary, prosecutor and accountant, son of Juan
Manuel Canaveris (1787–1830), Argentine army officer, son of Juan

See also
Canaveri